The Roman Catholic Diocese of Assis is a diocese located in the city of Assis in the Ecclesiastical province of Botucatu in Brazil.

History
 November 11, 1928: Established as Diocese of Assis from the Diocese of Botucatu

Special churches
Minor Basilicas:
Basílica São Vicente de Paulo

Bishops
 Bishops of Assis (Latin Rite)
 Antônio José dos Santos, C.M. (1929.11.22 – 1956.02.01)
 José Lázaro Neves, C.M. (1956.02.11 – 1977.07.20)
 Antônio de Souza, C.S.S. (1977.07.20 – 2004.10.27)
 Maurício Grotto de Camargo (2004.10.27 – 2008.11.19), appointed Archbishop of Botucatu
 José Benedito Simão (2009.06.24 - 2015.11.27 )
 Argemiro de Azevedo (2017.02.25 - present)

Coadjutor bishops
José Lázaro Neves, C.M. (1952-1956)
Antônio de Souza, C.S.S. (1974-1977)

Auxiliary bishops
José Lázaro Neves, C.M. (1948-1952), appointed Coadjutor here
Eugène Lambert Adrian Rixen (1995-1998), appointed Bishop of Goiás

Other priest of this diocese who became bishop
Otacílio Luziano Da Silva, appointed Bishop of Catanduva, São Paulo in 2009

Sources
 GCatholic.org
 Catholic Hierarchy

References

Roman Catholic dioceses in Brazil
Christian organizations established in 1928
Assis, Roman Catholic Diocese of
Roman Catholic dioceses and prelatures established in the 20th century